The School of Electrical and Computer Engineering (FEEC) is one of the most well-renowned engineering schools in Brazil. It was created in 1967 on UNICAMP's main campus in Campinas, São Paulo, Brazil, as the Department of Electrical Engineering of the School of Engineering. It became an independent unit in 1986, renamed the School of Electrical Engineering. Subsequently, in 1996, it was changed to its current name, adding computer engineering courses in partnership with the Institute of Computing.

See also
 School of Technology

External links
School of Electrical and Computer Engineering

Educational institutions established in 1967
University of Campinas
1967 establishments in Brazil
Engineering universities and colleges in Brazil